Rail transport is an important mode of long-distance transportation in China.

Almost all rail operations are handled by the China State Railway Group Company, Limited, a state-owned company created in March 2013 (as China Railway Corporation) after the dissolution of the Ministry of Railways. It was converted into a joint-stock company and placed under the control of the Ministry of Finance in June 2019.

China's railways are the busiest in the world. In 2019, railways in China delivered 3.660 billion passenger trips, generating 1,470.66 billion passenger-kilometres and carried 4.389 billion tonnes of freight, generating 3,018 billion cargo tonne-kilometres. Freight traffic turnover has increased more than fivefold over the period 1980–2013 and passenger traffic turnover has increased more than sevenfold over the same period. 
During the five years 2016–2020, China's railway network handled 14.9 billion passenger trips, 9 billion of which were completed by bullet trains, the remaining 5.9 billion by conventional rail. The three figures surged 41 percent (from 10.6 to 14.9 billion), 152 percent (from 3.6 to 9 billion) and decreased 16 percent (from 7 to 5.9 billion) from those during the 12th Five-Year Plan period, respectively.

China built 9,000 km of new railway in 2015.

History

Qing dynasty (1876–1911)

The first recorded railway track to be laid in China was a -long miniature gauge demonstration line that a British merchant assembled outside the Xuanwumen city gate at Beijing in 1865 to demonstrate rail technology. The Qing government was uninterested and had the line dismantled. The first railroad to enter commercial service was the Woosung railway, a  railway from Shanghai to Woosung (modern Shanghai's Baoshan District) which opened in 1876. This was also built by the British, without approval from the Qing government, which had the line dismantled one year later. Until the defeat of China in the First Sino-Japanese War, the government remained hostile toward railway construction. Beginning in 1895, the government began to grant rail concessions to foreigners, and permitted direct connection to the capital Beijing.

The first indigenous-designed and -constructed railway by Chinese was the Beijing-Zhangjiakou Railway built from 1905 to 1909, a difficult job due to the mountainous terrain. The chief engineer of this railway was Zhan Tianyou, who is known as the Father of China's Railway.

Republic of China in mainland period (1912–1949)

During the Republic of China era from 1912 until 1949, the development of the railway network in China slowed due to repeated civil wars and the invasion of Japan in the Second Sino-Japanese War. One of the few exceptions was in Northeastern China (Manchuria). The Russian Empire opened the Chinese Eastern Railway in 1901; after the Russo-Japanese War (1904–1905), the Japanese gained control of the portion of the Chinese Eastern Railway south of Changchun, using it to create the South Manchuria Railway Company (SMR) in 1906; this company was often referred to as "Japan's East India Company in China" due to its extensive influence in the political and economic situation of Manchuria. During the reign of the Fengtian warlords from 1912 till 1931, numerous privately owned railway companies were formed. Some of the railway investment in the late 1930s was financed by the China Development Finance Corporation associated with businessman and statesman T. V. Soong.

After the Japanese staged the Mukden Incident on 18 September 1931 as a pretext for invading Manchuria and the subsequent establishment of a puppet state called "Manchukuo", private railways were nationalized and merged to form the Manchukuo National Railway (MNR). In 1935, the Japanese bought the northern portion of the Chinese Eastern Railway from the Soviet Union and merged it into the MNR. In addition to the MNR and SMR, several other railway companies were established in the Japanese-occupied parts of China, including the North China Transportation Company, the Central China Railway, and the East Manchuria Railway.

People's Republic of China (1949–)

After the establishment of the People's Republic of China, the new government under Mao Zedong invested heavily in the railway network. From the 1950s to the 70s, lines, especially those in western China, were expanded. One example is the  railway from Lanzhou to Ürümqi, which was built between 1952 and 1962. In Southwestern China, where difficult terrain prevails, several mountain railways were constructed, such as the Baoji–Chengdu railway, built in the 1950s, and the Chengkun railway, built in the 1970s. The railway to Tibet, one of the highest in the world, was finally completed and opened to the public in 2006. Today, every province-level entity of China, with the exception of Macau, is connected to the railway network.

Not only has the Chinese railway network expanded in size since 1949, but it has also seen great technological advances. Before the 1980s, most of the railways were powered by steam. China's first diesel locomotive, the Dongfeng, was introduced in 1958 and their first production model diesel, the DF4, was introduced in 1969. However, the early dieselization efforts were slowed by problems with the early DF4s and steam locomotive production continued into the late 1980s. During the 1980s and 90s, diesel and electric locomotives replaced the steam engines on main lines. However, steam locomotives didn't retire from some provincial railways until the 21st century. In December 2005, the world's last regular revenue mainline steam train finished its journey on the Jitong railway, marking the end of the steam era. Nevertheless, there are still some steam locomotives used in the industrial railways in China.

Since 1997, train speed has been raised significantly six times.

In March 2013, the Ministry of Railways was dissolved and its safety and regulation duties were taken up by the Ministry of Transport, inspection duties by the State Railway Administration and construction and management by the China Railway Corporation (CR).

As of July 2020, 95% of cities over 1 million have been connected by high-speed rail.

Railway administration
Railways in China are defined into three main legal categories: national railways, local railways and designated railways. National railways are managed by the State Council of the national government and account for the bulk of railways in China. Local railways, which are operated by provincial or municipal governments, totaled a mere  in 2013, less than 4% of the national total. Designated railways are operated by enterprises such as mines and steel mills. Since the 1980s, the national and local governments have jointly funded railway construction, sometimes using private capital. Joint stock railways constituted about 32% of the national network in 2013. The Luoding Railway in Guangdong, built as a joint-stock railway with investments from the local and national governments in 2001, was gradually privatized and is one of the few privately owned passenger railways.

For over fifty years, except for a brief interlude during the Cultural Revolution, all national railways were operated and regulated by the Ministry of Railways of the People's Republic of China. In March 2013, the State Council broke up the Railway Ministry into the National Railway Administration to oversee railway regulation and the China Railway Corporation, a state-owned company, to operate the national railways. The National Railway Administration is a sub-ministerial bureau assigned to the Ministry of Transport. The China Railway Corporation is a ministerial-level state company under the State Council. The last railway minister, Sheng Guangzu, became the general manager of the China Railway Corp. He outranks Lu Dongfu, the chief of the National Administration of Railways, who had previously been a deputy railway minister.

Railway bureaus and management
The China Railway Corporation assumed most of the assets of the Ministry of Railways and continues to manage the railways at three levels—the national level, the bureau or subsidiary company level, and the station level. Below are the 18 rail bureaus of the China Rail Corporation and the number of passenger stations each bureau managed in 2013. The National Railway Administration has seven oversight bureaus, based in Shenyang, Shanghai, Guangzhou, Chengdu, Wuhan, Xian and Lanzhou, to oversee these China Railway bureaus. 

Beijing Railway Bureau (138)
Chengdu Railway Bureau (105)
Guangzhou Railway Group (97)
Harbin Railway Bureau (280)
Hohhot Railway Bureau (52)
Jinan Railway Bureau (280)
Kunming Railway Bureau (40)
Lanzhou Railway Bureau (54)
Nanchang Railway Bureau (84)
Nanning Railway Bureau (107)
Qinghai-Tibet Railway Group (8)
Shanghai Railway Bureau (138)
Shenyang Railway Bureau (408)
Taiyuan Railway Bureau (82)
Ürümqi Railway Bureau (22)
Wuhan Railway Bureau (66)
Xi'an Railway Bureau (94)
Zhengzhou Railway Bureau (62)

Revenues and investments

In 2013, railway transport generated ¥605 billion in revenues, an increase of 14.1% from the year before.

To meet growing demand for rail service, the state is making large investments in rolling stock and infrastructure. In 2013, investments in rail totaled ¥808.8 billion, of which ¥662.3 billion on rail infrastructure, and ¥146.5 billion on rolling stock.

Employment
The railways employed 2,184,400 workers in 2013, an increase of 139,000 from the year before. Worker output averaged Y482,600 per person.

Energy use
In 2014, the railways consumed 16.526 million tonnes of coal equivalent of energy, a decrease of 4.6% or 801,000 tonnes from 2013. It took 4.51 tonnes of coal equivalent to transport one million tonne-km of freight.

Track network

Railway electrification is made with the AC 27.5kV 50 Hz system.

China had the second longest railway network in the world and the longest high-speed rail network, and all provinces and regions are connected by high-speed rail except for Tibet due to its extreme terrain and sparse population

As of 2014 50.8% of the railroad was double-tracked and 58.3% was electrified. The railway network's density was 116.48 km per 10,000 km2.

Track gauge

 Standard gauge:   gauge (2008)
 Metre gauge:   (Kunming–Hai Phong railway)
 Narrow gauge:   gauge local industrial lines (1998 est.)

Mainlines
Sixteen major rail corridors consisting of eight running north–south, called verticals, eight running east–west, called horizontals, connect 81 major cities. At that time, the existing mainlines accounted 43% of the railroads in the country but carried 80% of the passengers. The last of the vertical mainlines was completed in 2009 and the last horizontal line opened in 2010.

Eight Verticals
 Beijing–Harbin Railway
 East Coast Corridor
 Beijing–Shanghai Railway
 Beijing–Kowloon Railway
 Beijing–Guangzhou Railway
 Datong–Zhanjiang Corridor (Datong–Puzhou, Taiyuan–Jiaozuo, Luoyang–Zhanjiang)
 Baotou–Liuzhou Corridor (Baotou–Shenmu, Shenmu–Yan'an, Xi'an–Yan'an, Xi'an–Ankang, Xiangyang–Chongqing, Sichuan–Guizhou, Guizhou–Guangxi)
 Lanzhou–Kunming Corridor (Longhai, Baoji–Chengdu, Chengdu–Kunming)

Eight Horizontals
Beijing–Tibet (Beijing–Baotou, Baotou–Lanzhou, Lanzhou–Qinghai, Qinghai–Tibet)
Northern Coal Transport Corridor
Southern Coal Transport Corridor
Trans-Eurasia Corridor (Longhai, Lanzhou–Xinjiang, Northern Xinjiang)
Nanjing–Xi'an Railway
Yangtze River Corridor (Nanjing–Tongling, Tongling–Jiujiang, Wuhan–Jiujiang, Changjiangbu-Jingzhou, Yichang–Wanzhou, Dazhou–Wanzhou)
Shanghai–Kunming Railway
Southwest Coastal Access Corridor (Nanning–Kunming, Hunan–Guangxi, Litang–Zhanjiang)

High-speed lines

 
In the past decade, China has been building an extensive high-speed rail grid that is overlaid onto the existing railway network. Most of the new lines follow the routes of existing trunk lines and are designated for passenger travel only. Several sections of the national grid, especially along the southeast coastal corridor, were built to link cities that had no previous rail connections. Those sections will carry a mix of passenger and freight. High-speed trains on passenger dedicated lines can generally reach . This ambitious national grid project was planned to be built by 2020, but the government's stimulus has expedited time-tables considerably for many of the lines.

 Completed lines  Partially completed lines.

Vertical HSR corridors

Horizontal HSR corridors

Stations
Railway stations in China are classified into six classes: special, first, second, third, fourth and fifth. A special class station can handle at least 60,000 passengers and 20,000 pieces of baggage, load at least 750 freight carriages or assign at least 6,500 carriages per day. A first class station can handle at least 15,000 passengers and 1,500 pieces of baggage, load 350 carriages or assign 3,000 carriages per day. A second class station can handle at least 5,000 passengers and 500 pieces of baggage, load 200 carriages or assign 1,500 carriages per day. In 2008, there were 5,470 train stations, including 50 special class stations, 236 first-class stations, 362 second-class stations and 936 third-class stations.

Bridges

The rail network across China's diverse topography makes extensive use of bridges and tunnels. In recent years, advances in bridge-building and tunneling techniques have enabled Chinese railroad builders to reduce overall track length and increase train speeds on rail lines through rugged terrain. The Yichang–Wanzhou railway, built from 2003 to 2010 across the karst landscape between Wuhan and Chongqing, has 159 tunnels and 253 bridges, which account for 74% of the railway's total length. High-speed rail lines are often built on elevated tracks to reduce the need to acquire land and involve very long bridges. The Beipan River Shuibai Railway Bridge built in 2003 in Guizhou is the world's highest railway bridge.

Tunnels

The first railroad tunnel was built in 1888 by the Qing dynasty in Taiwan. The oldest rail tunnel on the mainland is the  Greater Khingan Rail Ridge built in 1904 on the Chinese Eastern Railway in modern-day Inner Mongolia. The longest tunnel in China is the  Taihangshan Tunnel on the Shijiazhuang–Taiyuan high-speed railway in northern China. Several longer tunnels are under construction.

Train ferries

The most notable train ferries in China are the Guangdong–Hainan Ferry, across the Qiongzhou Strait between the Leizhou Peninsula on the south coast of Guangdong and the island of Hainan, and the Bohai Train Ferry, connecting the Liaodong and Shandong Peninsulas across the Bohai Bay. These two ferries began operating, respectively, in 2003 and 2007.

A river ferry carries trains on the Xinyi–Changxing railway across the Yangtze River at Jingjiang, halfway between Nanjing and Shanghai. In the first half of the 20th century, all trains traversing the Yangtze River required ferries. Since the completion of the Wuhan Yangtze River Bridge in 1953, at least fifteen railway bridges and two subway tunnels now span the Yangtze.

High-speed rail

High-speed rail in China refers to any train service (generally passenger only) with average train speeds above . High-speed service on China Railway High-speed (CRH) train sets was officially introduced in 2007.

In the decade prior to the introduction of high-speed rail, the travel speed of conventional trains was raised on most of the mainlines. By 2007, the top speed for passenger trains reached  on main lines such as the Jinghu railway, Jingha railway, and Jingguang railway. This speed enhancement was expected to boost passenger and cargo capacity by 18 percent and 12 percent, respectively.

Prior to the adoption of conventional tracks for high-speed rail, planning authorities also experimented with maglev technology. The train makes the  trip from the Pudong Airport to the city in less than 7.5 minutes.

Passenger transport

Rail is one of the principal means of passenger transport in China. In 2014, railways delivered 2.357 billion passenger trips and generated 1,160.48 billion passenger-km, compared to 1.456 billion trips and 772.8 billion passenger-km in 2008. The sharp increase in the number of train trips taken is driven by the rapid growth of high-speed rail service.

The difference may be explained by the near-absence of traditional commuter rail systems (low cost, frequent service, frequent stops) in China; the incipient Beijing Suburban Railway may perhaps be their only specimen in the country. However, a number of high-speed intercity railways have been opened since 2005, and many more are under construction; they may attract an increasing share of short-distance trips.

Classes of service
Passenger trains are identified by their class of service (usually indicated by letter prefix for faster trains) followed by three to four numerals indicating the bureau and region of operation. The syllables in bold will be used in broadcasting in train stations, for example, C1234 will be pronounced as cheng-1234.

Trains starting with G, C, D are run by CRH EMUs and form the high-/higher-speed network in China, while other trains are locomotive-hauled conventional trains.

Regular services stopping at all stations remain mostly limited to remote areas lacking high-speed services, including many ethnic minority regions, and are heavily subsidized.

Types of cars
The newer high-speed train service (Classes G, C and D) that use electrical multiple units have the following types of cars:

High-speed sleeper carriages (WR), with capacity for 40, have 20 enclosed compartments each with two berths. A few trains have a deluxe high-speed sleeper (WG), with capacity for 40 and eight compartments that are more spacious. High-speed sleepers are found on some D-class overnight trains.
First class coaches (ZY), with capacity for 44–72, have partially reclining plush seats and power outlets, there are four seats in each row.
Business class coaches (SW), with capacity for 24–56, are found on some high-speed train sets such as the CRH380A and CRH380BL. They have reclining sofa seats with flat screen TVs, power outlets and other amenities. Only available on G trains and some D trains.
Second class coaches (ZE), with capacity for 83–101, have the most affordable seats on high-speed trains, there are five seats in each row.

Most high-speed trains have dining cars (CA). Some have sight-seeing cars (ZYG, ZEG, SWG) that are attached to the front or end of the train.

The following types of cars are found on traditional, non-high-speed trains:

Deluxe soft sleeper, with capacity for 20–36, have two-berth compartments with private bathroom and television. Most long-distance trains carry this carriage along with Soft sleeper carriages.
Soft sleeper carriages (RW), with capacity for 36 (50 in double-decker cars (SRW)), have enclosed, lockable compartments with four sleeping berths. The upper berths can be folded up to allow for seating in the lower berths.
Hard sleeper carriages (YW), with capacity for 60–66 (76–80 in double-decker cars (SYW)), have 11 open bays or semi-compartments with six sleeping berths in each. Within each bay, the sleeping berths are stacked three on each side (lower, middle and upper). The lower berths cost the most and the upper berths, the least.
Soft seat carriages (RZ), with capacity for 72–88 (108–110 in double-decker cars (SRZ)), have plush seats and more legroom and are available only on some K, T and Y class trains. 
Hard seat carriages (YZ), with capacity for 116–128 (170–180 in double-decker cars (SYZ)), have cushioned but stiff seats and provide the most basic seating option on non-high speed trains (Classes K, T, Z, L, regular fast, regular). On crowded trains, riders with standing room tickets will stand in the aisles of hard seat cars.

Long-distance trains have dining cars (CA).

Holidays
Demand for tickets increases dramatically during the Chinese New Year and the two Golden Week holiday in early May and October, as many migrant workers and students return home and travelers go on vacation. The Golden Weeks are holidays organized May Day (1 May) and National Day (1 October). Chinese New Year also called the Spring Festival, follows the lunar calendar and is in January or February.

In 2009, the duration of the May holidays was shortened from one week to a long weekend, but holiday traffic remained strong, setting a one-day record of 6.54 million passengers carried over the Chinese rail network on 1 May 2009.

The month-long period before, during and after the Chinese New Year is known as Chunyun or "spring transport" for the China's railways. During this period, train service increases to meet the demand from one of the largest annual human migrations in the world. Since railway transport is the cheapest method for long-distance travelers in China, the railway is the most important transport method during the Chunyun period. For example, during the 40 days of the 2007 Chunyun period, it is estimated that 156 million passengers rode trains, which corresponds to 3.9 million passengers per day, compared to the overall average of 2.4 million per day. To make the situation even worse, traffic is highly imbalanced: before the Chinese New Year, passengers mainly travel from the large cities and after the holiday, the traffic reverses. Although hundreds of temporary trains are operated, train tickets are still in short supply. Trains are very crowded during this period, for example; a passenger car with 118 seats may accommodate more than 200 people.

Freight transport

Freight trains in China are primarily used to ship bulk cargo. The important cargo is coal, which accounts for more than half of total rail freight tonnage. In 2013, 2.322 billion tonnes of coal were shipped on trains in China, about 58% of the total rail freight tonnage of 3.967 billion. Another one-fifth of rail freight was devoted to ores and minerals, which were 851 million tonnes (21.5%) in 2013. Other major categories of bulk goods include grain (110 million tonnes, 2.77% in 2013) and fertilizer (87 million tonnes, 2.19% in 2013). Container cargo constitutes a small but growing fraction of about 5% of the total rail traffic. Despite impressive passenger statistics, freight rail modeshare in China trails other countries like USA, where some 40% of all tonnage is shipped by rail, according to US Federal Railroad Administration or Switzerland where a similar share of ton kilometers of freight is carried by rail. In China, that number is only 8% as of 2016 and 77% for highways out of 43 billion tonnes, but the share of railways is expected to increase due to new environmental regulations in regards to air pollution, which is expected to force millions of trucks off roadways.

Nearly all rail freight in China is used for domestic shipping. International rail cargo totaled 58 million tonnes in 2013, about 1.46% of overall freight tonnage. The four largest rail ports of entry, Manzhouli, Suifenhe, Erenhot, Alashankou and accounted 56 million tonnes or 96.5% of the total.

Cities in the Chinese interior have opened international rail freight routes to promote trade. In 2011, Chongqing began freight service to Duisburg, Germany, via Kazakhstan, Russia and Poland. The route shortened shipping time from five weeks by sea to about two weeks, and costs 80% less than air cargo.

Military transport

The People's Liberation Army (PLA) uses the railway system to transport personnel, supplies, conventional and strategic arms. The military used to play a more prominent role in railway development and management. The PLA's Railway Construction Corps, which in the 1950-1970s built many of the railroads in the Southwest, became a civilian company in 1984 and is now China Railway Construction Corporation. For a time during the Cultural Revolution, the entire Railway Ministry was placed under the PLA's command.

Rolling stock

As of 2013, China's rail inventory included 21,100 locomotives, a net increase of 261 from the year before. Electric locomotives were 55.0% of the total, with diesel locomotives accounting nearly all of the remainder. In 2011, there were 19,431 locomotives owned by the national railway system. Another 352 locomotives are owned by local railroads and 604 operated by joint-venture railways.

The inventory in recent times included some 100 steam locomotives, but the last such locomotive, built in 1999, is now in service as a tourist attraction while the others have been retired from commercial service.

Among the most common types of Chinese locomotives are the DF (Dongfeng or "East Wind") diesel series, the SS (Shaoshan) electric series, and the HX (Hexie or "Harmony") series. In the first decade of the 21st century, China began to import and produce AC/DC-AC transmission electric locomotives; the most numerous of these are the HXD series "Harmony" locomotives for freight loads. Most modern trains, for example for the China Railway High-Speed service, are either imported or produced in China using technology transfer agreements.

In 2013, there were 60,600 passenger cars, 85.9% of which were air conditioned. The Harmony Express electrical multiple units totaled 1,411 sets and 13,696 cars. Freight cars totaled 710,100. In 2011, there were 52,130 passenger coaches and 622,284 freight cars.

High speed rolling stock

 China Railway High-speed (CRH): CRH1, CRH2, CRH3, CRH5, CRH6, CRH380A, CR400AF, CR400BF, CR300AF, CR300BF
 Zefiro 380
 X 2000
 Blue Arrow
 China Star

International linkages
China is a member of the International Union of Railways (UIC). The country's UIC code is 33. Chinese railways has adopted and begun to implement the GSM-R wireless rail communications standard. China is also a signatory to the Trans-Asian Railway Network Agreement, an initiative of the UN Economic and Social Commission for Asia and the Pacific to promote the integration of railway networks across Europe and Asia.

Current and past links
International passenger train services are available to destinations in:
 Kazakhstan, Mongolia, and Russia. These countries use  gauge, so there is a break-of-gauge.
 Hong Kong SAR , Laos, and North Korea. These use standard gauge.
 Vietnam, although Vietnam predominately uses  rail gauge, the line running up from Hanoi to the border between China and Vietnam, which is the only line currently receiving international passenger train service from China, is dual-gauged. Therefore, there are no break of gauge problem in the service.

Hong Kong

Train services to Hong Kong terminate at the Hung Hom station in Kowloon. Within Hong Kong the cross-boundary services use the tracks of the East Rail line. There are three through-train routes, Beijing line (to/from Beijing), Shanghai line (to/from Shanghai) and Guangdong line (to/from Zhaoqing and Guangzhou East). An express train service linking Hong Kong and Guangzhou entered service in September 2018. This new express rail line will reduced the train travel time between Hong Kong and Guangzhou from 2 hours to 1 hour.

North Korea

There are rail crossings along the border with North Korea at Dandong, Ji'an and Tumen.

This is the most heavily used rail connection between the two countries.

There are four weekly trains with hard and soft sleepers from Beijing to Pyongyang, as well as a weekly carriage attached to the Vostok train from Moscow via Harbin, Shenyang and Dandong.

Russia
China's three rail crossings into Russia are all located along the eastern section of the border between the two countries. 

The crossings at Manzhouli and Suifenhe are at either ends of the Trans-Manchurian Railway, which was a shortcut for the Trans-Siberian Railway built through northeastern China in the early 1900s. Manzhouli, in the Hulunbuir region of northern Inner Mongolia, is China's busiest inland port. It borders Zabaykalsk in Zabaykalsky Krai of Russia's Transbaikal region and handles the bulk of the bilateral freight trade and one of the Beijing-Moscow passenger train routes. Suifenhe, in southern Heilongjiang, borders the town of Pogranichny in Primorsky Krai of the Russian Far East. The rail station on the Russian's side is called Grodekovo. Freight trains from Harbin to Khabarovsk and Vladisvostok pass through Suifenhe. As of November 2008, there was no through passenger service, but one could travel along this route with transfers in Suifenhe, Grodekovo and Ussuriysk.

A third rail connection is located further south at
Hunchun in eastern Jilin bordering Kraskino, near the southwest tip of Primorsky Krai. This border crossing began operating in February 2000, and saw only a minor amount of traffic (678 railcars of lumber) over the next two years. The line was closed in 2002–2003, reopened in 2003, but, as of the summer of 2004, it was still reported as seeing little traffic. The line was closed between 2004 and 2013. As of 2011–2012, plans existed for reopening it, primarily to be used for shipping coal and mineral ores from Russia to China; The border crossing reopened, initially in a trial mode, in 2013.

There are two weekly passenger trains in each direction between Beijing and Moscow. The No. 19/20 trains travel  via Harbin, Manzhouli and the Trans-Siberian Railway. Both journeys are among the longest train services in the world.

Mongolia

The lone rail connection with Mongolia's railways is located at Erenhot, in Xilingol League of central Inner Mongolia, which borders Zamyn-Üüd in Mongolia's Dornogovi Province.

There are two trains every week departing from Beijing and Hohhot to Ulaanbaatar, along with five trains per week from Erenhot. As with rail service to Russia, trains from China need to change bogies in Erenhot, since Mongolia uses broad gauge.

Kazakhstan

There are two rail crossings on the China–Kazakhstan border, at Alashankou and Khorgas, both located in the northern part of the Xinjiang. They are the only international rail outlets in western China.

At Alashankou, in the Bortala Mongol Autonomous Prefecture, the Northern Xinjiang railway passes through the Dzungarian Gate to the town of Dostyk, in Kazkahstan's Almaty Province and connects to Qazaqstan Temir Zholy (Kazakhstan's railway system). This crossing, opened in 1990, forms a New Eurasian Land Bridge, allowing trains from Lianyungang on the East China Sea to reach Rotterdam on the North Sea. There are two weekly passenger trains (one Kazakh and one Chinese) from Almaty to Ürümqi, the capital of Xinjiang. There are differing reports on which of the two is more comfortable, and the Chinese train is generally of a higher standard than the Kazakh train.

Khorgas, in the Ili Kazakh Autonomous Prefecture, is located southwest of Alashankou in the Ili Valley. The town on the Kazakh side of the border in Almaty Province, has the same name, Korgas. Here, the Jinghe–Yining–Khorgas railway, a 286-km fork off the main Northern Xinjiang line built in 2009, meets the Zhetigen-Korgas railway, a 239-km branch from the Turkestan–Siberian Railway completed by Kazakhstan in 2011. The Khorgas crossing, opened in December 2012, provides a more direct route from Ürümqi to Almaty.

Vietnam

There are two rail connections between China and Vietnam, at the Friendship Pass and Hekou. At the Friendship Pass on the border between Pingxiang, Guangxi Zhuang Autonomous Region and Đồng Đăng in Vietnam's Lạng Sơn province, the Hunan–Guangxi railway connects to the dual gauge Hanoi-Đồng Đăng Line. The crossing, opened in 1955, has displaced the older Hekou crossing as the primary rail link between the two countries. There are twice weekly trains from Beijing to Hanoi and both traverse the Friendship Pass. The trains consist of a typical T style Chinese express from Beijing to Đồng Đăng. The train may require passengers to detrain in Nanning for 5 hours (especially on the northbound service); a lounge area with reclining chairs is available for Soft Sleeper passengers.

At Hekou, the narrow-gauge Kunming–Hai Phong railway from Kunming, in Yunnan crosses into Vietnam's Lào Cai province. This line, also known as the Yunnan–Vietnam railway, was built by France from 1904 to 1910 though rugged terrain. Cross-border service on this line ceased in late 2000, but freight trains have kept this crossing operational.

Laos

A railway connecting Kunming to the border with Laos is under construction, which connects to another under construction line linking the border to the Lao capital Vientiane, which already has a real link to Thailand. The line was opened on 3 December 2021 at the 60th anniversary of China–Laos relations.

Proposed rail links
In recent years, China has been actively exploring and promoting the extension of its railway network to neighboring countries and distant regions including the Russian Far East, Southeast Asia, South Asia, Central Asia, the Middle East and even North America.

Macau
Macau SAR is currently served by Macau Light Rail Transit completed in 2019. A "Hengqin Branch Line" is planned for the network, which will connect the network directly to Hengqin, part of Zhuhai in Guangdong. The extension line is planned to connect with Guangzhou–Zhuhai intercity railway at the Hengqin station which is part of its first phase extension project that is scheduled to complete in year 2018, and would facilitate seamless cross border rail transit.

Additionally, the city of Guangzhou, Zhongshan, and Zhuhai have proposed the construction of a new "Guangzhou-Zhongshan-Zhuhai-Macau Intercity Railways" which could further connectivity on the west bank of Pearl River Delta.

Russian Far East
In November 2008, the transport ministries of Russia and the China signed an agreement to build one more link between the railway systems of the two countries. One project involves the Tongjiang-Nizhneleninskoye railway bridge across the Heilongjiang (Amur) River, connecting Tongjiang in Heilongjiang with Nizhneleninskoye, a village in Russia's Jewish Autonomous Oblast. The project construction began in 2014 and was estimated to be complete in year 2016, however the project had been halted by funding problems and construction delay by Russian side. Additional funding have been injected to the project in year 2017 which resolved the funding problem, and the project is currently estimated to be complete in year 2018.

Additionally, a high speed rail link between Hunchun and Vladivostok have been proposed and discussed.

Mongolia
In October 2014, the Mongolian parliament approved two standard gauge cross-border railways to China. One line would run  from the Tavan Tolgoi coalfields of Ömnögovi Province to the border at Gashuun Suukhait and cross into China at Ganqimaodu in Urad Middle Banner, part of Inner Mongolia's Bayan Nur Municipality. The other would run from central Mongolia to Bichigt in Sükhbaatar Province and cross into China at Zhuengadabuqi of East Ujimqin Banner, under Inner Mongolia's Xilingol League.

Central Asia
Since 1997, the governments of China, Kyrgyzstan and Uzbekistan have discussed the building of a  railway across the Tian Shan mountains from Kashgar in the western Tarim Basin of the Xinjiang to the Ferghana Valley via southern Kyrgyzstan. In March 2013, the China Road and Bridge Corp., an engineering firm, submitted a feasibility study to the Kyrgyz government, which found the project to be too expensive. In December 2013, Kyrgyz president Almazbek Atambayev expressed his preference for an alternative line that would connect the northern and southern halves of the country.

On 5 May 2014, the Export-Import Bank of China lent Uzbekistan $350 million for the construction of a railway through the Kamchik Pass that would connect the Fergana Valley with the rest of Uzbekistan. On 12 May 2014, China's paramount leader, Xi Jinping, and Turkmenistan's president, Gurbanguly Berdymukhamedov, signed a declaration to study the possibility of inviting Chinese companies to build a cross-border railway linking the two countries. On 22 May 2014, the Foreign Minister of Kyrgyzstan reportedly suggested inviting China to join in another regional railway project linking Russia, Central Asian states and the Persian Gulf.

Nepal
China and Nepal signed a series of agreements including a railway link connecting Kathmandu to China's railway network in 2018. The China–Nepal Railway will connect Kathmandu and Shigatse, Tibet. Survey of the Kerung-Kathmandu section will be completed by early 2019, and construction is expected to be completed in six years.

Pakistan

Since 2007, Chinese and Pakistani authorities have explored the possibility of building the Khunjerab Railway, which would cross the Karakorum Mountains and connect Kashgar with Havelian in the Abbottabad District of northern Pakistan. In June 2013, the Pakistani government indicated that the proposed railway could be extended to the Port of Gwadar on the Arabian Sea. As of February 2014, however, Chinese rail experts said the railway was unlikely to be built in the near term.

India
Indian and Chinese rail authorities have in several occasions expressed interest in initiating a high-speed rail link that would link Kolkata with Kunming, China via Myanmar. The rail link would use the under construction railway from Manipur, India to Myanmar and the Dali–Ruili railway under construction in western Yunnan Province.

Longest train journeys

Some of the world's longest train journeys by distance travel through China. Beijing-Moscow trains via Harbin (No. 19-20, 8984 km, 144 hours) and Ulan Bator (No. 3-4, 7826 km, 131 hours) are respectively the second and third longest regularly scheduled passenger trains in the world. Only the Moscow-Vladivostok train (9259 km, 178 hours) is longer. Within China, the longest passenger train services are the Z264-Z265 Guangzhou-Lhasa (4980 km, 54 1/2 hours), T206/3-T204/5 Shanghai-Yining (4742 km, 55 2/3 hours), Z136/7-Z138/5 Guangzhou-Ürümqi (4684 km, 49 1/2 hours) and K1121 Harbin-Haikou (4458 km, 65 3/4 hours). In addition, the longest train journey in China by time is K2288/2285 from Changchun to Kunming, with a duration of 68 hours.

The G/403/405 Beijing West – Kunming South train (2760 km, 10 3/4 hours), became the longest high-speed rail service in the world.

See also 
 List of railway lines in China
 Narrow-gauge railways in China
 Urban rail transit in China
 Transport in China
 Rail transport in Taiwan
 Rail transport in Hong Kong

Notes

 a.  There is a significant discrepancy in the total length of China's railways reported by China Statistical Yearbook ( at year end 2015) and the CIA Factbook ( in 2014). The CIA Factbook figure is based on "the total length of the railway network and of its component parts." The Statistical Yearbook figure includes "the total length of the trunk line for passenger and freight transportation in full operation or temporary operation" and measures the actual route distance between the midpoints of railway stations. Any double-tracked route or route with a return track of shorter distance is counted using the length of the original route. The length of any return tracks, other tracks within stations, maintenance and service tracks (such as those used to turn trains around), tracks of fork lines, special purpose lines and non-revenue connecting lines are excluded. The Statistical Yearbook provides cross-year and cross-regional breakdowns of railway length and its figures are presented in China railway articles.

References

External links

 Ministry of Railways 
  Chinese Railways
 Individual passenger train maps
  Shanghai Maglev Transrapid
 China Train Guide
 China Train Schedules
China Academy of Railway Sciences
Facts about Trains in China
2010 China Railways Official Promotional Video: Harmonious Railways
Steam Railway Photographs – China